Branko Radivojevič ( / ; born 24 November 1980) is a Slovak former professional ice hockey forward who began and finished his career playing for HK Dukla Trenčín of the Slovak Extraliga (Slovak). He played in the National Hockey League (NHL) with the Phoenix Coyotes, Philadelphia Flyers and Minnesota Wild. His  father Matija, a Bosnian Serb, came to Czechoslovakia during the 1970s as a contractor of a Yugoslavian company.

Playing career
Drafted by the Colorado Avalanche in 1999, Radivojevič signed a 3-year deal with the Phoenix Coyotes on June 19, 2001 and played parts of the next three seasons there. Part of a mid-season trade in 2003–04, he was sent to the Philadelphia Flyers along with Sean Burke and the rights to Ben Eager for Mike Comrie. After 2005–06, the Flyers declined to tender him a qualifying offer, thus making him an unrestricted free agent. He signed with the Minnesota Wild as an unrestricted free agent on July 6, 2006. After a couple seasons with the Wild, he opted to go to the KHL.

After two years with the Wild, Radivojevič signed with Spartak Moscow of the Kontinental Hockey League (KHL). In the 2008–09 season Branko established himself as an offensive presence with Spartak, leading the team in scoring with 45 points in 49 games. He was re-signed to a further two-year contract with Spartak on December 23, 2009.

After three seasons with Spartak (during the last one he was the captain of the team) Branko decided to change the team. After some arguments with Spartak's management his contract was terminated and Branko signed with Atlant Moscow Oblast. After spending only one season with Atlant (2011–2012) he returned to Spartak. For 2013-14 season he signed with Neftekhimik Nizhnekamsk, but changed the team during the season for Slovan Bratislava.

In the 2014–15 season, Radivojevic returned to his original hometown club in HK Dukla Trenčín of the Slovak Extraliga. However, after just 12 games he left for the Czech Extraliga, signing for the remainder of the season with HC Bílí Tygři Liberec on October 14, 2014.

Returning for a third stint with Dukla, Radivojevic played the final two seasons of his 21-year career before announcing his retirement upon the conclusion of the 2018–19 season on March 20, 2019.

Career statistics

Regular season and playoffs

International

Awards and honours

References

External links
 
 
 
 

1980 births
Living people
Belleville Bulls players
Colorado Avalanche draft picks
Atlant Moscow Oblast players
HC Bílí Tygři Liberec players
HC Slovan Bratislava players
HC Spartak Moscow players
Ice hockey players at the 2010 Winter Olympics
Ice hockey players at the 2014 Winter Olympics
Luleå HF players
Minnesota Wild players
Olympic ice hockey players of Slovakia
Sportspeople from Piešťany
Philadelphia Flyers players
Phoenix Coyotes players
Slovak expatriate ice hockey players in Russia
Slovak ice hockey right wingers
Slovak people of Serbian descent
Springfield Falcons players
VHK Vsetín players
Slovak expatriate ice hockey players in the Czech Republic
Slovak expatriate ice hockey players in Canada
Slovak expatriate ice hockey players in Sweden
Slovak expatriate ice hockey players in the United States